Live In Concert At Lollapalooza is a live album by American rock band Journey, recorded in 2021 and released in 2022.

Track listing

Personnel
Journey
per
Arnel Pineda – lead vocals
Neal Schon – guitar
Jonathan Cain – keyboards
Marco Mendoza – bass guitar
Jason Derlatka – keyboards, vocals
Deen Castronovo – drums
Narada Michael Walden – drums

Charts

References

2022 live albums
Journey (band) live albums